The Provincially Administered Tribal Area (PATA) was the former administrative subdivision of Pakistan designated in the Article 246(b) of the Constitution of Pakistan. No Act of Provincial Assembly can be applied to PATA whereas the Governor of the respective province has mandate parallel to the authority President of Pakistan has over Federally Administered Tribal Areas. In 2018, a Twenty-fifth Amendment to the Constitution of Pakistan merged PATA, as well as FATA into full control of the Khyber-Paktunkhwa government, thus the PATA designation has no legal standing in the future of Khyber-Paktunkhwa.

Provincially Administered Tribal Areas as defined in the Constitution include four former princely states as well as tribal areas and tribal territories in districts:

Khyber-Pakhtunkhwa
Upper Chitral District (former Chitral state)
Lower Chitral District (former Chitral state)
Upper Dir District (former Dir state) 
Lower Dir District (former Dir state) 
Swat District (former Swat state including Kalam)
Buner District (former Swat state)
Shangla District (former Swat state)
Kohistan District (former Swat state)
Malakand
 Amb state (now in Swabi District)
Torghar District (Kala Dhaka)
Tribal Area adjoining Battagram District (Battagram, Allai and Upper Tanawalormer)

Balochistan
Zhob District
Killa Saifullah District
Musakhel District
Sherani District
Loralai District
Duki District
Barkhan District
Kohlu District
Dera Bugti District
Dalbandin Tehsil of Chagai District

See also 
 Federally Administered Tribal Areas

References

External links 
 Constitution of Pakistan; Tribal Areas

 
Former subdivisions of Pakistan
States and territories established in 1970
Federalism in Pakistan
Geography of Khyber Pakhtunkhwa
States and territories disestablished in 2018
2010s disestablishments in Pakistan